Strongyloides dasypodis is a parasitic roundworm infecting the large intestine of the armadillo, Dasypus novemcinctus. It was first described from Louisiana.

References

Further reading

Santos, Karina Rodrigues dos. "Caracterização morfológica e molecular de Strongyloides ophidiae (nematoda, strongyloididae) parasitas de serpentes." (2008): 57-f.

External links 

Strongylidae
Parasitic nematodes of mammals
Nematodes described in 1966